Field's metal, also known as Field's alloy, is a fusible alloy that becomes liquid at approximately . It is named after its inventor, Simon Quellen Field.  It is a eutectic alloy of bismuth, indium, and tin, with the following mass fractions: 32.5% Bi, 51% In, 16.5% Sn.

When prepared, Field's metal can be melted in hot water. Field's metal is costly because its major component indium is expensive, priced at around double the price of silver. Because it includes neither lead nor cadmium, it is much less toxic than Wood's metal. It can be used for small-run die casting and rapid prototyping.

This alloy has been investigated as a possible liquid metal coolant in advanced nuclear power system designs. Field's metal is also of interest to nanotechnology researchers.

Although it is much less dangerous to use than other commonly melted metals, such as lead or aluminium, contact with Field's metal in the liquid state can cause third-degree burns.  Indium has also been associated with Indium lung in workers frequently exposed to indium processing.

Similar alloys

References

Fusible alloys
Bismuth compounds
Tin alloys
Coolants
Indium compounds